The 2010 IBSA World Blind Football Championship is a blind football tournament and the fifth World Blind Football Championship. The competition was staged in the United Kingdom between 14 August and 22 August 2010, and involved ten teams of visually impaired players from around the world competing to be crowned world champion. It was won for the third time by Brazil, who defeated Spain 2–0 in the final.

The tournament
The championships, which took place at the Royal National College for the Blind in Hereford, was the first to have been held in the United Kingdom. The draw for the 2010 World Blind Football Championship was held on Monday 12 April 2010 at Wembley Stadium in London and overseen by Sir Trevor Brooking, the Football Association's Director of Football Development, and George Cohen, who was part of England's winning team at the 1966 FIFA World Cup.

The tournament got under way on the afternoon of Saturday 14 August with the opening match between England and Spain. Brazil won the tournament after beating Spain 2–0 in the final on 22 August. It was the third occasion on which Brazil have won the competition, and their team's striker, Jefferson Goncalves, was named Player of the tournament for what was described by the Hereford Times as an outstanding performance. Host nation England achieved their best result to date, coming fourth overall, but missing out on a medal after losing 5–1 to Brazil in the semi-final, then to China in the third place play off. Feng Ya Wang of China was named Young player of the tournament, while Antonio Martin of Spain won the Golden Boot. Martin's Spanish team-mate, Alfredo Gonzalez, was voted the best goalkeeper of the tournament. Japan was presented with the Fair Play trophy by Mayor of Hereford, Councillor Anna Toon.

Results

Group stage

Group A

Group B

Knockout stage
9th place play-off 

Semi-finals
Semi-final 1

Semi-final 2

7th place play-off

5th place play-off

3rd place play-off

Final

Positions 
 Brazil
 Spain
 China
 Great Britain
 France
 Colombia
 Argentina
 Japan
 Greece
 South Korea

References

External links
 blind2010.com
 

2010
2010 in association football
2009–10 in English football
Royal National College for the Blind
2010
August 2010 sports events in the United Kingdom